Franciszek Wróblewski (26 March 1789 – 28 April 1857) was a Polish noble, physician and a Doctor of Medicine.

Biography 
Franciszek Wróblewski was born to a wealthy family of Ślepowron coat of arms. He was the youngest of the three sons of Józef Wróblewski and Anna Wróblewska (née Eysmont). He attended Vilnius University, where he earned his title in the field of medicine. On May 20, 1815 he earned M.D. degree in Medicine from Vilnius University on his thesis De carcinomate bulbi oculi ejesque cura.

On May 19, 1813, he married Zofia Szytler in Vilnius. Together they had three sons - Józef Onufry, Ludwik Franciszek and Franciszek Seweryn.

He practiced medicine in Vilnius, where he was one of the most famous local doctors. For his merit he was awarded Order of Saint Anna by Emperor Nicholas I of Russia.

Franciszek Wróblewski was buried at Rasos Cemetery.

See also
 Wróblewski (Ślepowron)

Notes

1789 births
1857 deaths
Physicians from Vilnius
19th-century Polish nobility
Franciszek
Recipients of the Order of St. Anna
Burials at Rasos Cemetery